Semmedu is a small village at the foot of the Velliangiri hills (the kailash of South), 30 km from Coimbatore, in Tamil Nadu , India. It is under the administration of the Ikkarai Boluvampatty panchayat.

Culture

There are several temples, including Poondi, Velliangiri.  A fairly level trek leads to the cave temple where there is a natural formation of Lingam (Lord Shiva).  Kottaikadu Maaga Amman kovil, built by the Cholas and according to ancient records contained a fort built 500 years ago, of which no trace remains. The temple is part of Archaeological Survey of India. The idol of the temple depicts Sri Meenakshi Amman of Madurai and it is believed that both idols have were carved by the same sculptor. The Isha Yoga Meditation centre and ashram is a new addition.

History
Semmedu was founded in the early 1900s by Vellakinar Chinnappa Gounder, who purchased 500 acres of land from an Australian. He brought in settlers of different castes and creed to supplement the few people who were already living there. Later his sons Vellingiri, Palanisamy Kalisamy and Subbiah Gounder continued to develop the village.

Geography

The river Noyyal, a tributary to Cauvery, originates from the Siruvani Hills and flows through this village.  The Boluvampatti forest reserve is nearby.

References

Villages in Coimbatore district